The USTA Men's Clay Courts of Tampa is a defunct tennis tournament that was played on the Grand Prix tennis circuit from 1991 to 1993. The event was held in Tampa, Florida and was played on outdoor clay courts.

Singles

Doubles

References
 ATP Archives

Clay court tennis tournaments
Defunct tennis tournaments in the United States
ATP Tour